Hero Realms is a card-based deck building fantasy tabletop game, designed by Rob Dougherty and Darwin Kastle and published in 2016 by Wise Wizard Games. The game started out as a Kickstarter campaign in 2016. The goal of Hero Realms is to destroy your opponent or opponents by purchasing cards using "Gold" and using these cards to attack your opponent's "health" and their champions using your "combat" points or other powerful effects.

Hero Realms is similar to other deck building games, like Star Realms, Ascension, and Dominion. The game is marketed as portable and expandable, as it comes in a small box and contains only cards and no dice or markers.

Winning the game 
A player wins when they reduce their opponent's score (called health) to zero.

Expansions 
Wise Wizard Games have released five Character Packs that act as custom starting hands:
 Wizard (2016)
 Cleric (2016)
 Thief (2016)
 Ranger (2016)
 Fighter (2016)
 The Dragon Boss Deck  (2017)
 The Lich Boss Deck  (2017)
 The Ruin of Thandar Campaign Deck  (2017)
The Lost Village Campaign Deck (2019)
The Ancestry (2019)
Journeys – Travelers (2019)
Journeys – Hunters (2019)
Journeys – Discovery (2019)
Journeys – Conquest (2019)

Reception
Hero Realms won the 2018 Origins Award for Fan Favorite Card Game.

 2018 Origins Awards Best Card Game Nominee
 2017 Best Science Fiction or Fantasy Board Game Nominee
 2016 Golden Geek Best Card Game Nominee
 2016 Golden Geek Best 2-Player Board Game Nominee

The game has mainly received neutral or positive reviews. Sprites + Dice have mentioned that the game "succeeds in refining Its predecessor" and BGL have described it as "perfect if you need a quick, fun card game as a filler between heavier games"

References

External links 
 Official Hero Realms Shop
 The publisher's official Hero Realms website
 Hero Realms on Facebook
 Hero Realms on Twitter
 Hero Realms Kickstarter campaign
 Hero Realms on BoardGameGeek

Kickstarter-funded tabletop games
Origins Award winners
Card games introduced in 2016